A mock election is an election for educational demonstration, amusement, or political protest reasons to call for free and fair elections.  Less precisely it can refer to a real election purely for advisory (essentially without power) committees or forums such as some student councils, particularly those that chiefly emulate a real legislative body.

For educational purposes 
Secondary schools sometimes organize mock elections to introduce young people to the concept of elections before they have reached their voting age. The elections aim to give the participants an understanding of democracy, the role of government and parliament. The experience helps encourage future young voters to cast a ballot. They can have real or fake candidates depending on the school and what the mock election is for.

For a change to democratic elections 
As a way to introduce democratic elections in Bhutan, in preparation for the Bhutanese general election in 2008, a mock election was held on April 21, 2007, to prepare the Bhutanese for the imminent change to democracy. This election featured 4 pretend political parties and randomly-selected high school students as candidates.

For amusement and parody 

In the United Kingdom before the Great Reform Act 1832 a mock election is known to have been held in the grounds of a notable debtors' prison, Kings Bench Prison in 1827, shown by a painting of one of the inmates. In the painting, which is not very subversive to the status quo, is a red flag-like banner that reads "Liberty of the Subject", whilst showing some chaotic frivolity and sherry glasses, and a gilt or bronze-tipped policeman's truncheon with a decorative bow. Turnkeys (guards) participated in the revelry but the governor faced censure and questions in parliament.

See also 
 Humours of an Election, a series of four oil paintings and later engravings by William Hogarth that illustrate, creatively, the election of a member of parliament in Oxfordshire in 1754.
 
 

Elections by type
Educational materials